Withernsea High School is a coeducational secondary school located in Withernsea in the East Riding of Yorkshire, England.

The school was officially opened on Thursday 28 April 1955 by Edward Wood, 1st Earl of Halifax. In December 2014 works began on a rebuild and refurbishment of the school buildings, with the works completed in summer 2016.

Today it is a community school administered by East Riding of Yorkshire Council.

Withernsea High School offers GCSEs and Cambridge Nationals as programmes of study for pupils.

References

External links
Withernsea High School official website

Secondary schools in the East Riding of Yorkshire
Educational institutions established in 1955
1955 establishments in England
Community schools in the East Riding of Yorkshire
Withernsea